Giovanni Opizzoni (died 1474) was a Roman Catholic prelate who served as Bishop of Belcastro (1418–1474).

Biography
On 24 April 1418, Giovanni Opizzoni was appointed during the papacy of Pope Martin V as Bishop of Belcastro.
He served as Bishop of Belcastro until his death in 1474.

References

External links and additional sources
 (for Chronology of Bishops) 
 (for Chronology of Bishops) 

15th-century Italian Roman Catholic bishops
Bishops appointed by Pope Martin V
1474 deaths